In mathematics, the little q-Laguerre polynomials pn(x;a|q) or  Wall polynomials Wn(x; b,q) are a family of basic hypergeometric orthogonal polynomials in the basic Askey scheme closely related to a continued fraction studied by . (The term "Wall polynomial" is also used for an unrelated Wall polynomial in the theory of classical groups.)
 give a detailed list of their properties.

Definition

The  polynomials are given in terms of basic hypergeometric functions and the q-Pochhammer symbol by

See also

References

Orthogonal polynomials
Q-analogs
Special hypergeometric functions